Adam Bahdaj (1918–1985) was a Polish translator and writer.

1918 births
1985 deaths
Polish children's writers
Polish translators
20th-century translators